Uzushio, meaning a whirlpool in Japanese, may also refer to:
 Uzushio (train), a train service in Japan
 Naruto whirlpools
 A submarine of Japan Maritime Self-Defense Force
 JDS Uzushio (SS-566), an Uzushio class submarine
 JDS Uzushio (SS-592), an Oyashio class submarine